The year 1972 was the first year after the independence of Bangladesh. It was also the first year of the first post-independence government in Bangladesh.

Incumbents

 President: Syed Nazrul Islam (until 12 January), Abu Sayeed Chowdhury (starting 12 January)
 Prime Minister: Sheikh Mujibur Rahman (starting 12 January)
 Chief Justice: Abu Sadat Mohammad Sayem

Demography

Climate

Economy

Note: For the year 1972 average official exchange rate for BDT was 7.70 per US$.

Events
 8 January – Sheikh Mujibur Rahman was released from the Mianwali jail and allowed to leave Pakistan after more than nine months' imprisonment.  Two days later, after flying to London and Delhi, he returned to Dhaka to become the first President of Bangladesh.
 19 February – The 25-year Indo-Bangladeshi Treaty of Friendship, Cooperation and Peace is signed in Dhaka.
 17 March – Indian army leaves Dhaka.
 19 March – The prime ministers of Bangladesh and India sign the Joint Rivers Commission.
 26 March – Regulations passed allowing large scale nationalization of various industries including banks, manufacturing and trading enterprises.
 4 April – The United States of America officially recognized Bangladesh.
 Smallpox outbreak in Khulna Municipality leads to 1384 cases and 372 deaths between 28 April and 22 June 1972.
 4 June – A crowded passenger train from Khulna crashes into a stationary freight train at Jessore when the stationmaster throws the wrong switch; 76 people are killed and about 500 injured.
 25 August – The first veto by China in the Security Council barred Bangladesh from membership in the United Nations.
 4 November – Constitution of the People's Republic of Bangladesh is adopted by the Assembly.
 16 December – Constitution of Bangladesh comes into effect.

Sports
 Domestic football:
  Bangladesh Football Federation was founded on 15 July.
  On 13 February, a match between President XI and Bangladesh XI took place at the Dhaka Stadium in the presence of Bangabandhu Sheikh Mujibur Rahman, this was the first football match in independent Bangladesh. The President XI won the match 2–0, with goals from Golam Sarwar Tipu and Abdul Ghafoor. 
 Mohammedan SC won the first edition of the Independence Cup, while East End Club came out runners-up. This was the first football tournament arranged in the newly independent nation.
 On 11 May 1972, India's Mohun Bagan AC (played as "Gostha Pal XI") was the first foreign football club to visit independent Bangadesh, took on Independence Cup champions Mohammedan SC. The Indian's won the game 1–0. On 13 May, Mohun Bagan took on the "Dhaka XI", who were the unofficial Bangladesh national team (as Bangladesh were not yet an AFC or FIFA member), consisting of the best players in the country at the time. Dhaka XI striker Kazi Salahuddin scored the only of the game in front of more than 35,000 spectators at the Dhaka Stadium.
In August of that year, Dhaka XI travelled to India's Guwahati to take part in the Bordoloi Trophy. The team finished runners-up behind East Bengal Club.
 Abahani KC was founded.
 Domestic cricket:
 Bangladesh Cricket Control Board was founded.

Births
 Al-Amin Hossain, cricketer
 Asif Akbar, singer
 Riaz Uddin Ahamed Siddique, actor
 Aminul Islam, trade unionist
 Avijit Roy, writer and blogger
 Mohamed Mahbub Alam, sprinter

Deaths

 30 January – Zahir Raihan, novelist, writer and filmmaker (b. 1935)
 25 February – Syed Muhammed Taifoor, historian and writer (b. 1885)
 6 April – Syed Nausher Ali, politician (b. 1891)
 1 May – Shah Abdul Hamid, politician and legislator (b. 1900)
 12 May – Kafiluddin Chowdhury, politician and legislator (b. 1898)
 9 September – AKM Fazlul Kabir Chowdhury, politician and legislator
 30 November – Mokarram Hussain Khundker, professor and researcher (b. 1922)

See also 
 1970s in Bangladesh
 List of Bangladeshi films of 1972

References

 
Bangladesh
Bangladesh